James William McIntosh (born 19 August 1950) is a Scottish former footballer who played as a right winger. He played for Nottingham Forest, Chesterfield (on a short loan) and Hull City in England's Football League, either side of two spells at Montrose in his homeland.

After his playing career ended, he worked at the Timex Group factory in his hometown of Dundee, then operated a Post Office in Girvan, Ayrshire.

References 

1950 births
Living people
Scottish footballers
Footballers from Dundee
Association football wingers
Montrose F.C. players
Chesterfield F.C. players
Nottingham Forest F.C. players
Hull City A.F.C. players
Dundee United F.C. players
Arbroath Victoria F.C. players
Scottish Football League players
English Football League players
Scottish Junior Football Association players